Nannamma Super Star (ನನ್ನಮ್ಮ ಸೂಪರ್ ಸ್ಟಾರ್) is a Kannada game show involving celebrity mothers and their children, and it is airing on  Colors Kannada and streamed on Voot. The show is dedicated to motherhood as the mother-child duos compete in fun tasks for the title of Nannamma Super Star. The judges of the show are Srujan Lokesh, Anu Prabhakar and Tara. The show is hosted by Anupama Gowda. The show premiered on 27 November 2021.

Production 
A celebrity game show like no other, featuring 12 awesome celebrity mothers who participate with their children, and the pair that excels in games, compatibility, and entertainment will take home the coveted title competing for the title of Nannamma Super Star. Each week brings unique themed tasks and challenges where the mothers and their children will not just have to win the game but also win hearts with their compatibility and entertaining ability. The surviving duo will be crowned Nannamma Super Star. The show is produced by Pixel Pictures Private Limited.

Contestants 
A total of 12 celebrity mothers, mostly TV actors are part of the show.

Weekly summary

References 

2021 Indian television series debuts
Kannada-language television shows
Colors Kannada original programming
Indian television series based on non-Indian television series
Indian dance television shows
Celebrity reality television series